Concepción Department may refer to:

 Concepción Department (Paraguay)
 Concepción Department, Corrientes

See also
 Concepción (disambiguation)

Department name disambiguation pages